Gaeta Calcio 1931 is an Italian association football club located in Gaeta, Lazio. It currently plays in Eccellenza.

History 
The club was founded in 1931 as Associazione Calcio Aquilotti and was subsequently renamed Polisportiva Gaeta, before taking the current name.

In the season 2011–12 it was relegated to Eccellenza.

Colors and badge 
The team's color are white and red.

References

External links
Official homepage

Football clubs in Italy
Football clubs in Lazio
Gaeta
Association football clubs established in 1931
1931 establishments in Italy